Bashdaha is a union parishad under Satkhira Sadar Upazila of Satkhira District in the division of Khulna, Bangladesh.

References

Unions of Satkhira Sadar Upazila
Unions of Satkhira District